Holmes Chapel is a civil parish in Cheshire East, England. It contains eleven buildings that are recorded in the National Heritage List for England as designated listed buildings. Of these, one is listed at Grade I, the highest grade, two are listed at Grade II*, the middle grade, and the others are at Grade II. The parish is occupied by the large village of Holmes Chapel and the surrounding countryside. What is now the Crewe–Manchester railway line passes through the parish, and there are two listed structures associated with this, the Twemlow Viaduct and a nearby boundary post. Also running through the parish is the River Dane, and a bridge crossing it is listed. The other listed buildings are houses, cottages and farmhouses, together with a church and a public house.

Key

Buildings

See also

Listed buildings in Brereton
Listed buildings in Cranage
Listed buildings in Sproston
Listed buildings in Twemlow

References
Citations

Sources

Further reading

Listed buildings in the Borough of Cheshire East
Lists of listed buildings in Cheshire